Scrobipalpa chrysanthemella is a moth in the family Gelechiidae. It was described by Ernst Hofmann in 1867. It is found in Germany, Austria, Switzerland, Italy, the Czech Republic, Slovakia, Serbia, Bosnia and Herzegovina, Hungary, Romania, Russia and Turkey.

The forewings are blackish brown, with light grey and yellowish-grey scales. The hindwings are grey.

The larvae feed on Leucanthemum vulgare, Leucanthemum atratum, Tanacetum corymbosum and possibly Artemisia absinthum. They mine the leaves of their host plant. Mines are usually made in the tip of a basal leaf, occupying the full width of the leaf, with short galleries extending halfway down. A single larva makes several mines. Pupation may take place inside or outside the mine. The larvae have a yellowish body with pink tones and a brownish yellow head.

References

Scrobipalpa
Moths described in 1867